Eupithecia atacama is a moth in the family Geometridae. It is found in the regions of Antofagasta (Antofagasta Province) and Atacama (Huasco Province) in Chile. The habitat consists of the North Coast and Intermediate Desert Biotic Provinces.

The length of the forewings is about 8.5–9 mm for males and 8.5–10 mm for females. The forewings are greyish white with medium and dark brown plus some reddish brown scaling. The hindwings are paler than the forewings, with scattered dark scales distally. Adults have been recorded on wing in September, October and November.

References

atacama
Endemic fauna of Chile
Atacama Desert
Moths described in 1985
Moths of South America